Aaron Turner (born c. 1971) was an American football player.  He played college football for the Pacific Tigers football team from 1989 to 1992. In 11 games during the 1991 season, he caught 92 passes for 1,604 yards and 18 touchdowns. He led the NCAA major colleges that year in receiving yards. He led the Big West Conference in receiving yards for three consecutive seasons from 1990 to 1992. From 1989 to 1992, he caught 266 passes for 4,345 yards and 43 touchdowns.  In 2005, he was hired as the wide receivers coach at Saint Mary's College of California. He was inducted into the University of the Pacific Athletic Hall of Fame in 2007.

See also
 List of NCAA major college football yearly receiving leaders
 List of NCAA Division I FBS career receiving touchdowns leaders

References

American football wide receivers
Pacific Tigers football players
Living people
1971 births
Place of birth missing (living people)
Saint Mary's Gaels football coaches